is a Japanese volleyball player. She competed at the 2020 Summer Olympics, in Women's volleyball. 

She was part of the Japan women's national volleyball team. She participated at the 2017 FIVB U20 Women's Volleyball World Championship, 2018 Asian Games, and the 2018 FIVB Volleyball Women's Nations League.

Awards

Individual
 2015-16 All Japan High School Championship - Best Outside Hitter
 2015-16 All Japan High School Championship - Most Valuable Player
 2016-17 All Japan High School Championship - Best Outside Hitter
 2016-17 All Japan High School Championship - Most Valuable Player
 2017–18 V.Premier League Women's - Best Face Award

High school
2015-16 All Japan High School Championship -  Champion, with Shimokitazawa Seitoku
2016-17 All Japan High School Championship -  Champion, with Shimokitazawa Seitoku

References

External links 
 FIVB profile
 http://www.volleyball.world/en/women/schedule/8867-japan-argentina/post
 Instagram profile

1998 births
Living people
Japanese women's volleyball players
Place of birth missing (living people)
Japan women's international volleyball players
Volleyball players at the 2018 Asian Games
Volleyball players at the 2020 Summer Olympics
Asian Games competitors for Japan
Olympic volleyball players of Japan